Notre Dame University Bangladesh or NDUB is a private Catholic research university in Bangladesh. Located in Motijheel, Dhaka, the university was founded by the Congregation of Holy Cross in 2013. After receiving approval from the Ministry of Education, the People’s Republic of Bangladesh, and University Grants Commission (UGC), Notre Dame University Bangladesh commenced its academic activities in the fall of 2014.

History
On April 29, 2013, by an ordinance of the Ministry of Education, the People’s Republic of Bangladesh granted its approval to establish the university and to function under the Private University Act of 1992 and as amended in 1998.

Academic programs
The university's three departments are organized into three schools.

School of Engineering, Technology, and Sciences (SETS)

Undergraduate program
 Bachelor of Science in Computer Science and Engineering (CSE)

Graduate program
 Master of Science in Computer Science and Engineering (CSE)

Faculty of Business

Undergraduate program
The school offers an undergraduate Bachelor of Business Administration (BBA) degree. Available areas of concentration are Accounting, Economics, Finance, Management, Human Resource Management, International Business, Management Information Systems (MIS), and Marketing.

 Bachelor of Business Administration (BBA)

Graduate program (MBA)
The school offers an MBA degree. Students are allowed up to five years from the date of initial enrollment to complete the degree requirements. It is possible to finish the program within five semesters by taking the maximum course load, or within three semesters if students have waivers or transfer courses. Available areas of concentration are banking, finance, human resources management, and marketing.
 Master of Business Administration (MBA) (regular)

Graduate program (EMBA)
The school also offers an EMBA degree

 Executive Master of Business Administration (EMBA) (executive)

Faculty of Social Science and Humanities
 Bachelor of Social Science in Economics (BSS)
 Bachelor of Laws (LLB)
 Master of Laws (LLM)
 Bachelor of Arts in English Language & Literature (BA)
 MA in English literature (MA)
 MA in ELT and Applied Linguistics (MA)

Administration 

There is a separate admin building dedicated to administration activities.

List of vice-chancellors
Following is the complete list of the vice-chancellors.
 Professor Dr. Father Patrick Daniel Gaffney, CSC ( August 8, 2017, to present)

Library

The NDUB library has over  floor area on the southeastern side of the campus. It is the first fully automated university library in Bangladesh and uses its own library management software. As of August 2021, the library holds 9500 books, 500 online books, 600 bound journals (Foreign and local) and magazines, 90 CD-ROM databases and books, 226 DVDs and videos, 19 audio cassettes, and other resources.

Student life and facilities

Student body
The university has about 8000 regular students.

Facilities
 NDUB Language Center
 Computer Communications Laboratories
 Digital Systems Laboratory
 Software Engineering Laboratory

Health services
Health services are provided by a medical center at the campus.

Events
 International Career Summit
 Photography Festival
 Cultural Events
 NDUB CSE Fest 2021
 Father Benjamin Inter-University Basketball Tournament

Athletics
The university  encourages students to participate in various games and sports. The Games and Sports Committee, which consists of student and staff members, organizes the annual athletic competition.

Magazines, journals and research bulletins

The university publishes a journal called NDUB Research Journal 2020
 Journal of the Faculty of Science and Technology
 NDUB Bulletin
 NDUB Daystar: 2018-2019
 NDUB Research Journal 2020
 Journal of the Faculty of Business Administration

Recognition

The academic programs of the university are recognized by the following organizations:
 University Grants Commission (Bangladesh) UGC   (University Grants Commission, Bangladesh)

Ranking

In 2022, the university ranked 8,356 in the university rankings published by Webometrics Ranking of World Universities. It ranked 63nd out of Bangladeshi universities.

Extracurricular clubs
The University has seven extracurricular clubs: NDUB Drama and Film, NDUB English Club, NDUB Debate Club, NDUB Law Club, NDUB CSE Club, NDUB Business Club, and NDUB Cultural Club.

Centre for Modern Languages
 English
 French
 German
 Japanese
 Chinese
 Turkish

Affiliation and collaboration
Notre Dame University Bangladesh is a member of and has active collaboration with the following institutions:
 Ministry of Education (Bangladesh)
 University Grants Commission (Bangladesh) (UGC) 
 University of Notre Dame
 The University of Notre Dame Australia
 Notre Dame University - Louaize
 Notre Dame of Maryland University

Financial aid

Notre Dame University Bangladesh was founded to support financially disadvantaged students. One of the early donors was the scholarship program. The university has developed several scholarship programs for national and international students. The Open Society Foundation and the Open Society University Network have supported student activities and education.

Convocation

NDUB 1st Convocation on August 19, 2021

Academic session
 Spring: January to April
 Summer: May to August
 Fall: September to December

References

External links
 Official website

Universities and colleges in Dhaka
Private universities in Bangladesh
Educational institutions established in 2013
Holy Cross universities and colleges
2013 establishments in Bangladesh